Utricularia biovularioides is a small, suspended aquatic annual carnivorous plant that belongs to the genus Utricularia (family Lentibulariaceae). It is endemic to Brazil and, as of Peter Taylor's 1989 monograph on the genus, has only been located twice. The type specimen has not been located.

See also 
 List of Utricularia species

References 

Carnivorous plants of South America
Flora of Brazil
biovularioides